Three destroyers of the Spanish Navy were named Alcalá Galiano –
 , a  1927 sold to Argentina, renamed ARA Juan de Garay. Decommissioned 1960

Spanish Navy ship names